Hraničné is a village and municipality in Stará Ľubovňa District in the Prešov Region of northern Slovakia.

History
In historical records the village was first mentioned in 1342. The village was formerly known as Grenzdorf in German. The wooden church there was built in 1785.

In August 2021 it was announced that the road connecting the village to neighbouring Kremná would be repaired using EU funds.

Geography
It has a population of about 219 people.

Genealogical resources

The records for genealogical research are available at the state archive "Statny Archiv in Levoca, Slovakia"

 Roman Catholic church records (births/marriages/deaths): 1787-1939 (parish B)
 Greek Catholic church records (births/marriages/deaths): 1788-1949 (parish B)

See also
 List of municipalities and towns in Slovakia

References

External links
https://web.archive.org/web/20070513023228/http://www.statistics.sk/mosmis/eng/run.html
Surnames of living people in Hranicne

Villages and municipalities in Stará Ľubovňa District